

Risum Township or Risong Township
(), traditionally called Roksum in English,
is a township of Rutog County, in far western Tibet Autonomous Region, People's Republic of China. It is directly serviced by China National Highway 219. 
The closest airport is the Ali Kunsha Airport.

Villages 
Villages incorporated in the township are:
 Deru Village (德汝村) 
 Jiagang Village (甲岗村) 
 Guoba Village (过巴村)
The village has a population of about 14 people.

Notes

References

Bibliography
 

Populated places in Tibet
Township-level divisions of Tibet
Rutog County

zh:日松乡